Kery may refer to:

People
 Anikó Kéry (born 1956), Hungarian gymnast
 Kery James, French rapper
 Marián Kéry, (born 1978), Slovak politician
 Sabine Schut-Kery (born 1968), American dressage rider
 Theodor Kery (1918–2010), Austrian politician

Places
 Luce County Airport, United States (by ICAO code)

Other
 KERy or Streetcars in Kenosha, Wisconsin